The National Computing Education Accreditation Council (NCEAC) is an accreditation body under the administrative control of Higher Education Commission (Pakistan). NCEAC grants accreditation to institutes of Pakistan regarding different computing degrees including Software Engineering, Computer Science, Information Technology, Telecommunication and Networking, Bioinformatics and Information Systems.

See also 
List of computing schools in Pakistan

References

External links
 NCEAC official website

Educational organisations based in Pakistan
Higher Education Commission (Pakistan)
Computer science institutes in Pakistan